Helen Anne Donnelly Hutchinson (1934 – February 21, 2023) was a Canadian television personality.

Career  

She was a co-anchor of W5 (1979-1987),  Canada AM (1973-1979), Arts '73 and WTN's Point of View: Women. She graduated from University of Toronto with a master of library science degree in November 1994.

Personal life and death 

Hutchinson was married to CFL player Jack Hutchinson. She died on February 21, 2023.

References

External links 
 
 University of Toronto article
 CTV.ca history of W-FIVE

1934 births
2023 deaths
CTV Television Network people
Canadian television news anchors
Canadian women television journalists
University of Toronto alumni